

Season 
Inter was thought to be a favourite for the Serie A title, having - between others - three world champions in their squad. Well placed in the league, the side also reached the quarter-finals of the UEFA Cup after comebacks against Rapid Wien and Aston Villa. Trapattoni's team managed to progress to the final, beating also Atalanta and Sporting Lisboa. Lost hopes for the Scudetto, due to losses from the Genoa sides in May, Inter saved the season by winning the UEFA cup. The triumph was over fellow Italian side Roma, 2–1 on aggregate.

Squad

Goalkeepers
  Walter Zenga
  Astutillo Malgioglio
  Luciano Bodini

Defenders
  Giuseppe Bergomi
  Andreas Brehme
  Sergio Battistini
  Riccardo Ferri
  Antonio Paganin
  Massimiliano Tacchinardi
  Stefano Bettarini

Midfielders
  Lothar Matthäus
  Alessandro Bianchi
  Nicola Berti
  Davide Fontolan
  Fausto Pizzi
  Paolo Stringara
  Giuseppe Baresi
  Andrea Mandorlini

Attackers
  Aldo Serena
  Maurizio Iorio
  Jürgen Klinsmann

Competitions

Serie A

League table

Matches

Goalscorers
Lothar Matthäus - 16
Jurgen Klinsmann - 14
Aldo Serena - 8
Nicola Berti - 4
Giuseppe Bergomi - 3
Fausto Pizzi - 3
Sergio Battistini - 2
Alessandro Bianchi - 2
Andreas Brehme - 1
Paolo Stringara - 1

Coppa Italia 

Round of 16

Eightfinals

UEFA Cup 

Round of 32

Round of 16

Eightfinals

Quarterfinals

Semifinals

Final

References

Sources
- RSSF - Italy Championship 1990/91

Inter Milan seasons
Inter
UEFA Europa League-winning seasons